Società Sportiva Villacidrese Calcio was an Italian association football club located in Villacidro, Sardinia.

Its colors were white and blue.

History

The club was founded in 1979.

From Serie D to Lega Pro Seconda Divisione
Villacidrese finished first in Eccellenza Sardinia in the 1998–99 season, obtaining so its first ever promotion to Serie D.  For the next 10 seasons, the team has played in Serie D.

In the Serie D 2008–09 season, the team was ranked first place in Girone G, obtaining so a place in Lega Pro Seconda Divisione for the first time in its history, where it has played in 2009–10 in group A.

From Lega Pro Seconda Divisione to exclusion from football
The club has played its second season of professional football in the girone B of the Lega Pro Seconda Divisione. At the end of the season, the club was relegated to Serie D, also suffering a 13-point deduction.

In summer 2011 it does not appeal against the exclusion of Covisod from this league and it was excluded from all football.

References

External links
Official homepage

Football clubs in Italy
Association football clubs established in 1979
Association football clubs disestablished in 2011
Football clubs in Sardinia
Serie C clubs
1979 establishments in Italy
2011 disestablishments in Italy